Qilian may refer to:

Qilian County, in Qinghai, China
Qilian Mountains (Tsilien Mountains), in northwest China
Qilian Station, in Beitou District, Taipei, Taiwan